Carsten Henrik Bruun (7 November 1868 – 16 July 1951) was a Norwegian military officer, sport shooter and businessperson.

He was born in Tønsberg as the second son of ship-owner Carsten Henrik Carstensen Bruun (1828–1907) and Maren Sibylle Bull Foyn (1840–1918). He was an older brother of Svend Foyn Bruun, and as such an uncle of Svend Foyn Bruun Jr. On the paternal side he was a great-grandnephew of founding father Henrik Carstensen, and on the maternal side he was a grandson of Laurentius Føyn Jr, who was a brother of noted whaler Svend Foyn.

He was married to Esther Larsen (1872–1940).

He was a major in the infantry of the Norwegian Army, and served as chief executive officer of Elektricitets-Aktieselskabet AEG, the Norwegian branch of German company Allgemeine Elektricitäts-Gesellschaft (AEG). He also had a sporting career. At the age of 43 he participated in the men's trap competition at the 1912 Summer Olympics. He finished in joint 27th place. For his achievements he was decorated as a Knight of the Royal Norwegian Order of St. Olav.

References

1868 births
1951 deaths
People from Tønsberg
Norwegian Army personnel
Norwegian businesspeople
Norwegian male sport shooters
Shooters at the 1912 Summer Olympics
Olympic shooters of Norway